Jordan Suckley is a British Radio Host, DJ and Music Producer from Liverpool, England, who has composed and remixed notable tracks on albums that have reached No. 1 on the US iTunes Dance Charts. Jordan Suckley is most well known for his Trance tracks which have become Dance Music chart-toppers and garnered acclaim from Armin van Buuren, Aly & Fila and others who have found success in the genre.

Music career 
When Jordan Suckley was 18, he attended Swansea University for a degree in business.  While attending University, he entered in and won a DJ competition of which the prize was playing at Cream in Liverpool. After his first set, Suckley began DJing a few smaller gigs, until eventually he met a promoter at an Eddie Halliwell event in Bristol. He gave the promoter a demo mix and within a few days, the promoter called and offered to book him for a Gatecrasher tour in Wales for New Year's Eve.

In 2009 he was picked up by Black Hole Recordings and began touring around the United Kingdom; performing at various venues and small shows.

In 2010, while on a flight to play at PlanetLove at Shane's Castle, Northern Ireland, Suckley met Gareth Emery on his flight. They engaged in conversation in which Gareth Emery asked if Suckley would be interested in remixing a track from one of Emery's most popular albums Northern Lights. On 18 March 2011 the album was released entitled Northern Lights Re-Lit with remixes by acts including himself, Hardwell, Arty, Giuseppe Ottaviani, John O’Callaghan, Lange and Ashley Wallbridge. The album, within hours of release, became No.1 on the US iTunes Dance Chart.

On 28 February 2012, BBC Radio 1 announced that Suckley would be joining a new line up of DJs for the new In New DJs We Trust with B.Traits, Mosca and Julio Bashmore hosting shows on a four weekly rotation. This new schedule took effect on Monday, 2 April 2012.

In April, 2013 Suckley collaborated with Simon Patterson to present their creation 'Vanilla', released on Spinnin's Reset Records.  At the album's release, it garnered support from many music industry leaders and was rated in the top 5 of Beatport and Trackitdown charts.

In 2019, Suckley started his new, progressive and tech, side project called Chester Cat.

Discography

Albums
2014 – Goodgreef Future Trance – Black Hole Recordings
2016 - Damaged Australia V1 - Damaged Recordings
2017 - Damaged Asia V1 - Damaged Recordings
2019 - Damaged 100 - Damaged Recordings

Singles and contributions
2008 – Ben Nicky vs Jordan Suckley – Future Creature – Abstract Recordings
2008 – Savage – Abstract Recordings
2008 – Trusty Rusty – Infexious Recordings
2008 – Mac and Taylor and Jordan Suckley – Animal – Infexious Recordings
2009 – Flames! – Goodgreef Digital
2009 – From Paradise! – Goodgreef Digital
2009 – The Storm! – Goodgreef Digital, Global Sounds
2010 – We Are 10 – Goodgreef Digital
2010 – Tarzan – Reset Records
2010 – Lush! – Reset Records
2010 – The Hooded Claw – Reset Records
2010 – Patience/Chariot of the Gods – Liquid Recordings
2010 – Out Cold – Goodgreef Digital
2011 – The Slug – Goodgreef Digital
2011 – Jordan Suckley featuring Lisa Cowell – Latvian Sun – Reset Records
2011 – 23! – Reset Records
2011 – Jordan Suckley featuring Nasa – Rokit – Reset Records
2011 – Amar La Vida – Reset Records
2012 – Spooked – Liquid Recordings
2012 – Sunkissed – Liquid Recordings
2012 – Prisoner – Discover
2012 – Jordan Suckley featuring Leanne Thomas – Thunder – Night Vision
2013 – Simon Patterson and Jordan Suckley – Vanilla – Reset Recordings
2013 – Do or Die – Perfecto Fluoro
2013 – Santa Cruz – Liquid Recordings
2013 – Adam Ellis and Jordan Suckley  – Mandarine / Take No Prisoners – Subculture
2014 – Jordan Suckley and Eddie Bitar – Centipede – Damaged Records
2014 – Jordan Suckley and Paul Webster – Help! – Damaged Records
2014 – Contaminated – Damaged Records – Black Hole Recordings 
2014 – Access – Vandit Records
2014 – Elation – Damaged Records – Black Hole Recordings
2015 – Medic – Damaged Records – BLack Hole Recordings 
2015 – Droid – Damaged Records – Black Hole Recordings
2015 – Who Cares – Damaged Records – Black Hole Recordings
2016 – Tiësto – Suburban Train (Jordan Suckley Remix) – Black Hole Recordings 
2016 – Jordan Suckley and Sam Jones – Hijacker – Black Hole Recordings
2016 – Liquid Soul and Zyce featuring Solar Kid – Anjuna (Jordan Suckley Remix) – Black Hole Recordings
2016 – Jordan Suckley – Ritual – Damaged Records – Black Hole Recordings 
2016 – Jordan Suckley and Sam Jones – Wilma  – Damadeg Records – Black Hole Recordings
2017 – Jordan Suckley – Suspect 1 – Damaged Records – Black Hole Recordings
2017 – Jordan Suckley and Kutski – Survelliance – Damaged Records – Black Hole Recordings
2018 – Jordan Suckley and Ferry Corsten – Rosetta – Flashover Recordings
2018 – Jordan Suckley – C.Y.M. – A State of Trance
2018 – Jordan Suckley – Rocket Punch – Damaged Records – Black Hole Recordings
2018 – Jordan Suckley and Paul van Dyk – Accellerator – Vandvit
2019 – Jordan Suckely – Moskva – Damaged Records – Black Hole Recordings
2019 – Major League – Wonder? (Jordan Suckley Remix) – Damaged Records – Black Hole Recordings 
2019 – Markus Schulz Pres. Dakota – The Spirit of the Warrior (Jordan Suckley Remix) – Coldharbour Recordings
2020 - Jordan Suckley & Sam Jones - Space Jam - Damaged
2020 - Jordan Suckley - Another Dimension - Vandit
2020 - Jordan Suckley - Hold Me - Pure Trance Neon 
2020 - Jordan Suckley & onTune - Tranceformations Anthem 2020 - Damaged 
2021 - Jordan Suckley - Just A Dream - Vandit
2021 - Jordan Suckley & Clara Yates - Let Me Be Your Fantasy - Damaged 
2021 - Jordan Suckley - Retro Tech - Damaged
2022 - Jordan Suckley - Cruise Control/ Break The Spell - Damaged
2022 - Jordan Suckley - Palermo / Summer Kicks - Damaged
2022 - Jordan Suckley - Tribal Sense - Vandit
2022 - Waves_On_Waves & Jordan Suckley - Sandcastle - Severe Records

References

External links 
 

1985 births
English electronic musicians
Living people
Musicians from Liverpool